Tell may refer to:

Tell (archaeology), a type of archaeological site
Tell (name), a name used as a given name and a surname
Tell (poker), a subconscious behavior that can betray information to an observant opponent

Arts, entertainment, and media
 Tell (2012 film), a short psychological horror film by Ryan Connolly
 Tell (2014 film), a crime thriller starring Katee Sackhoff, Jason Lee and Milo Ventimiglia
 Tell Magazine, a Nigerian newsweekly
 "The Tell", an episode of NCIS
 "The Tell" (Teen Wolf), a television episode
 The Tell, a photomural, part of the Laguna Canyon Project

Places

Middle East
Tel Aviv, Israel
Et-Tell, an archaeological site identified with Bethsaida
Tell, West Bank, a Palestinian village near Nablus
Ancient Tell, Beirut, Lebanon; the Canaanite pre-Phoenician era of Beirut and archaeological site

United States
Tell, Texas, unincorporated community in the United States
Tell, Wisconsin, town in the United States
Tell City, Indiana, township in the United States
Tell Township, Emmons County, North Dakota, township in the United States
Tell Township, Huntingdon County, Pennsylvania, township in the United States

See also

Don't ask, don't tell (disambiguation)
Tall (disambiguation)
TEL (disambiguation)
Teller (disambiguation)
Tells (disambiguation)